Peter Boyce (born 14 May 1946) is an Australian athlete. He competed in the men's high jump at the 1968 Summer Olympics. He came 26th place and did not qualify for the final.

References

1946 births
Living people
Athletes (track and field) at the 1968 Summer Olympics
Australian male high jumpers
Olympic athletes of Australia
Athletes from Melbourne
20th-century Australian people